The 2023 Indoor Football League season will be the fifteenth (and fourteenth complete) season of the Indoor Football League (IFL). The league added one expansion team, the Tulsa Oilers. The Columbus Wild Dogs further postponed their debut to 2024, while the Bismarck Bucks suspended operations.

It's the first year of the IFL and the XFL player personnel partnership, with the IFL to functioning as their de facto minor league.

Teams

Rule changes
For the 2023 season, the IFL announced the following rule changes:
 The Deuce kick rule will now be in effect during the entire game.
 The ball is considered "live" if the kickoff hits the uprights or goalposts and comes back into the field of play. 
 The 25 second play clock will begin after the ball is spotted. 
 Positive yardage rule in the last 60 seconds of the game has been eliminated.

References

See also 
2023 National Arena League season

Indoor Football League seasons